Belinda Jones (born 20 December 1967) is an English writer.

Biography 
Jones was born in Royal Tunbridge Wells, Kent to parents Pamela (née Gwyther) and Trefor Jones. She grew up in Taunton, Devon, and studied at the London College of Printing. Her first job was on the children's comic, Postman Pat. At the age of 20, she moved on to become a feature writer on Woman's World. She spent four years working on More! magazine as a feature writer. She has had work published in Elle, Empire, FHM, Bliss, Company, and Cosmopolitan. In 1997 she moved to Los Angeles, but later returned to the UK where she wrote her successful first novel, Divas Las Vegas. Her second novel was I Love Capri. In 2009 she switched publisher from the Arrow imprint of Random House to Hodder.

Jones is the co-founder of Notting Hill Press with authors Talli Roland and Michele Gorman.

Her novels mainly fall into the women's fiction or "chick lit" categories, and usually combine romance and travel. On the Road to Mr. Right is an autobiographical travelogue.

Bibliography
 2001 – Divas Las Vegas
 2002 – I Love Capri
 2003 – The California Club
 2004 – On the Road to Mr. Right
 2005 – The Paradise Room
 2006 – Cafe Tropicana
 2007 – The Love Academy
 2008 – Out of the Blue
 2010 – Living La Vida Loca
 2011 – California Dreamers aka Hollywood Calling
 2012 – Winter Wonderland'
 2014 – The Travelling Tea Shop
 2018 – Bodie on the Road: Travels with a Rescue Pup in the Dogged Pursuit of Happiness (Skyhorse)

References

External links
 Official Site
 Penguin Random House profile
 Hodder author profile

1967 births
Living people
English women novelists
People from Royal Tunbridge Wells
English writers